Antiochia or Antiocheia or Antiochea or Antiokheia may refer to any of several Hellenistic cities in the Near East which were founded or rebuilt by the several rulers named Antiochus during the Seleucid Empire:

In modern Turkey

Antioch (Antiochia ad Orontem, Syrian Antiochia or Great Antiochia), modern Antakya
Principality of Antiochia, a Crusader state centered on it
Nisibis or Antiochia Mygdonia, in ancient Mesopotamia, now Nusaybin, Mardin Province
Antioch of Pisidia (also Antiochia in Phrygia), near modern Yalvaç, Isparta Province
Aydın, also known as Antiochia, Tralles or Tralleis, modern Aydın, Turkey
Alabanda or Antiochia of the Chrysaorians, Caria, modern Doğanyurt (formerly Araphisar), Aydin Province
Antioch on the Maeander (Antiochia ad Mæandrum), in Caria, formerly Pythopolis, ruins near Kuyucak, Aydin Province
Antiochia (Lydia), precise location unknown
Samosata or Antiochia in Commagene, now Samsat, Adıyaman Province
Cebrene or Antiochia in Troad,  Kevrin or Kebrene, now in Canakkale Province, Turkey
Edessa, Mesopotamia or Antiochia on the Callirhoe, former capital of Osroene, later named Justinopolis and Edessa, now Şanlıurfa
Tarsus (city), Antiochia on the Cydnus, or Tarsos, Mersin Province
Antiochia Lamotis (Antiochia in Isauria), now near Erdemli, Mersin Province
Antiochia ad Cragum (Antiochetta, Antiocheta, or Latin: Antiochia Parva), now Güney, Antalya Province
Antiochia ad Euphratem, submerged site in Gaziantep Province
Antiochia ad Pyramum, ruins near Karataş, Adana Province
Adana (Antiochia in Cilicia), now Adana, Adana Province
Antiochia ad Taurum, in Cilicia later in Commagene, probably now Gaziantep (less probably, Aleppo, Syria)
Antiochia Paraliou, location unknown but some identify it with Antiochia ad Cragum; probably in Turkey
Antiochia in Mesopotamia, also Antiochia in Arabia and Antiochia Arabis, and Constantia, now near Viranşehir, Şanlıurfa Province, Turkey

In modern Iran

 Nahavand or Antiochia in Persis, also Antiochia in Media and Antiochia of Chosroes, later Laodicea in Media, now Nahavand
 Bushehr, previously also “Antiochia in Persis”

In modern Iraq

Charax (Tigris) or Antiochia in Susiana, later Charax, near the confluence of the Tigris and the Choaspes rivers
Antiochia in Sittacene, in ancient Sittacene, between the Tigris and Tornadotus

In modern Israel
Hippos, Antiochia Hippos or Antiochia ad Hippum, in the Decapolis
Antiochia Ptolemais, now Acre, Israel or Akko

In modern Jordan

Umm Qais or Antiochia Semiramis, also called Gadara, now Umm Qais

In modern Syria

Antiochia in Pieria, now Arwad

In modern Turkmenistan and Uzbekistan

Antiochia in Margiana, now Merv, Turkmenistan
Antiochia in Scythia, on the Jaxartes (Syr Darya) river, now probably in Uzbekistan

In Colombia

The Antioquia Department of Colombia is considered to have been named either after the well-known Antioch or after a less well-known city of that name.